Tofutti Brands Inc. is a U.S. company based in Cranford, New Jersey, that makes a range of soy-based, dairy-free foods under the "Tofutti" brand that was founded by David Mintz. Tofutti sells an ice cream substitute for the lactose-intolerant, kosher parve, food allergy sensitive, vegetarian, and vegan markets.

History

In the 1970s, David Mintz, who owned catering companies in New York, decided to make non-dairy ice cream out of tofu, for his Orthodox Jewish customers who did not eat dairy and meat products together. After nine years of experimenting, Tofutti was introduced in 1981. David Mintz passed away in 2021.

Products
Tofutti produces an ice cream substitute, soy-based sour cream, cream cheese, sliced cheese, and "Better Than Ricotta" ricotta cheese. Additional products include several entrees such as a dairy-free pizza and "Cuties" or "Tofutti Cuties", their version of the ice cream sandwich. All Tofutti products are vegan.

Stock
Previously listed on the New York Stock Exchange under the ticker symbol TOF, Tofutti was delisted in 2016 and now trades over the counter under the symbol TOFB on the OTCQB market.

See also
 List of frozen dessert brands

References

External links
 Tofutti (USA)

Companies traded over-the-counter in the United States
Dairy-free frozen dessert brands
Kosher food
Vegan cuisine
Soy product brands
Animal product analogs
Plant milk
Cheese analogues
Companies based in Union County, New Jersey
Vegetarian companies and establishments of the United States